Abdulelah Bukhari (born July 18, 1994) is a Saudi football player who currently plays for Al-Wehda as a left back.

Honours 
Al-Ahli

References

External links
 

Living people
1994 births
Saudi Arabian footballers
Association football fullbacks
Al-Ahli Saudi FC players
Khaleej FC players
Ettifaq FC players
Al-Kawkab FC players
Al-Jabalain FC players
Al-Wehda Club (Mecca) players
Saudi First Division League players
Saudi Professional League players